Isle of Escape is a 1930 American pre-Code film produced and released by Warner Bros. The film stars Monte Blue and Myrna Loy and is set in the South Seas. Blue had been playing man-stranded-on-island roles in such films as White Shadows in the South Seas at MGM towards the end of the silent era and continued doing so in this early talkie.

Plot
Dave Wade, a young miner, manages to escape from some cannibals in the South Seas who have killed all of his companions. He arrives at the island of Samora with a bag of gold which he managed to save. Here he meets a brutal man named Shane and a woman named Stella, who had been forced into a secret marriage with Shane. The couple run a small hotel. Stella immediately sympathizes with Dave's plight, while Shane sets his greedy eyes on his gold. After the death of Stella's mother, Dave escapes with her to another island. Here they meet Moira, a native girl, who falls in love with Dave and desperately tries to divert his love away from Stella. Eventually, Shane discovers the whereabouts of his wife and arrives on the island.

Cast
Monte Blue as Dave Wade
Myrna Loy as Moira
Betty Compson as Stella
Noah Beery, Sr. as Shane
Ivan F. Simpson as Judge
Jack Ackroyd as Hank
Nina Quartero as Loru
Duke Kahanamoku as Manua
Nick De Ruiz as Dolobe
Rose Dione as Ma Blackney
 Adolph Milar as Dutch Planter

Box office
According to Warner Bros., the film earned $224,000 domestically and $58,000 foreign.

Preservation status
Isle of Escape is believed to be a lost film. Around 2010, a small fragment, running about forty seconds, was discovered by a private collector.

References

External links
 
 
 Isle of Escape lobby poster
 Southseascinema.org

1930 films
1930 drama films
1930 lost films
American black-and-white films
American drama films
Films directed by Howard Bretherton
Lost American films
Warner Bros. films
Lost drama films
1930s American films